Krystal Stadium is a multi-use stadium in Kherson, Ukraine. It is currently used mostly for football matches and is the home of FC Krystal Kherson. The stadium holds 3,400 spectators.

It is located in the city's center not far from Dnieper and is surrounded by several parks such as the Kherson Fortress Park, the Glory Park, and the City Park. 

The stadium is in somewhat poorer condition and had ongoing renovations since 2017. Built in 1962, it has never been properly renovated ever since.

References

1962 establishments in Ukraine
Sports venues completed in 1962
Football venues in Ukraine
Buildings and structures in Kherson Oblast
Sport in Kherson Oblast